Established in 1895, Milwaukee High School of the Arts (MHSA), formerly West Division Sr. High School, is a high school in Milwaukee, Wisconsin, United States. It is a part of the Milwaukee Public Schools system. It specializes in preparation for a profession in the arts.

Students receive a minimum of two hours of arts study each day. Focus is given to creative outlets such as dance, writing, theater, technical theater, visual arts, and music. The school is open for auditions to students from the Milwaukee metropolitan area.

In 2005, the MHSA Artvarks, their ComedySportz Improvisational High School League Team took home the State Championship.

History 
West Division High School opened in 1895 in what was known as the "Plankinton library block" on Grand Avenue downtown, but a building was built to house the new school in 1896 between 22nd and 23rd Streets on what was then called Prairie Street. C. E. McLenagan was the first principal. In 1958, the current structure was built, facing the original facility across what was by then called Highland Boulevard.

The Milwaukee Public Schools system began designating a number of specialty or magnet schools in 1976. West Division was designated to house the Law Specialty and Navy ROTC programs, until in 1984 the Milwaukee Board of School Directors moved those programs to Bay View High School and elected to transform West Division into an arts school.

References

External links
Milwaukee High School of the Arts website

High schools in Milwaukee
Art schools in Wisconsin
Schools of the performing arts in the United States
Educational institutions established in 1895
Public high schools in Wisconsin
Magnet schools in Wisconsin
1895 establishments in Wisconsin